Paynesville is an unincorporated community in  Buchanan County, Virginia, United States.

Paynesville is located on the West Virginia state line across from Paynesville, West Virginia; it is served by Virginia State Route 83.

References

Unincorporated communities in Buchanan County, Virginia
Unincorporated communities in Virginia